Mississippi Highway 494 (MS 494) is a  state highway connecting Union at MS 15 to MS 19 northwest of Meridian.

Route description
It heads southeast through a mix of open fields and woods passing some homes along the way. It passes through the community of Little Rock then generally heads more easterly passing to the north of Duffee. After entering Lauderdale County from Newton County, MS 494 begins to curve back towards the southeast. It enters the community of Schamberville and forms part of the border of the census designated place of Collinsville.

History
A state highway that followed MS 494 was first shown on state highway maps in 1951. The MS 494 appeared along the road by 1955 however references to it dated back to at least 1952. The only change to its routing was when MS 15 was moved to a bypass of Union in 1977, MS 494 was cut back to its current terminus from Old Decatur Road.

Major intersections

References

External links

494
Transportation in Newton County, Mississippi
Transportation in Lauderdale County, Mississippi